Syllepte fuscoinvalidalis is a moth in the family Crambidae. It was described by Hiroshi Yamanaka in 1959. It is found in Japan and China.

References

Moths described in 1959
fuscoinvalidalis
Moths of Japan
Moths of Asia